Cindarella is genus of trilobite-like Cambrian arthropod known from the Chengjiang biota of China. It is classified in the stem group of trilobites (Artiopoda) in the clade Xandarellida, along with Phytophilaspis, Sinoburius, and Xandarella.

See also

 Arthropod
 Cambrian explosion
 Chengjiang biota
 List of Chengjiang Biota species by phylum
 Cinderella

References

External links
Trilobite Systematic Relationships

Cambrian arthropods
Maotianshan shales fossils
Artiopoda

Cambrian genus extinctions